The women's 20 kilometres walk at the 2022 World Athletics Championships was held on a 1 kilometer loop course on Martin Luther King Jr. Blvd. adjacent to Autzen Stadium in Eugene on 15 July 2022. 41 athletes from 26 nations entered to the event.

Records
Before the competition records were as follows:

Qualification standard
The standard to qualify automatically for entry was 1:31:00.

Schedule
The event schedule, in local time (UTC−7), was as follows:

Results 
The race was started at 13:09. The results were as follows:

References

20 km walk
Racewalking at the World Athletics Championships